The 1899 Sewanee Tigers football team represented Sewanee: The University of the South in the 1899 Southern Intercollegiate Athletic Association football season. Sewanee was one of the first college football powers of the South and the 1899 team was one of its best. The 1899 Tigers won 12 games and lost none, outscored opponents 322–10, and won the Southern Intercollegiate Athletic Association (SIAA) title.   

The team of 21 players was led by head coach Herman "Billy" Suter and future College Football Hall of Famer and captain Henry "Ditty" Seibels. The team also featured Ormond Simkins, and the team's manager was future US Senator and newspaper publisher Luke Lea. The 11 extra points against  by Bart Sims is still a school record.  John Heisman's Auburn team was the only team to score on Sewanee.    

With just 18 players, the team known as the "Iron Men" embarked on a ten-day, 2,500 mile train trip, where they played five games in six days.  Sewanee had five shutout wins over  Texas (in Austin), Texas A&M (in Houston), Tulane (in New Orleans), LSU (in Baton Rouge), and Ole Miss (in Memphis). Sportswriter Grantland Rice called the group "the most durable football team I ever saw." The road trip is recalled memorably with the Biblical allusion "...and on the seventh day they rested."

Before the season
Despite being from a small Episcopal university in the mountains of Tennessee, the Sewanee team came to dominate football in the region during the end of the 19th and early 20th centuries. Like several other football powers of yore,  Sewanee today emphasizes scholarship over athletics.  The Sewanee Tigers today play in Division III, which does not allow for athletic scholarships.

Sewanee had seven starters return from the undefeated 1898 team. Before play started, the Sewanee men trained hard for several weeks under coach Suter. With experience and leadership, the team was hopeful for an undisputed southern championship.  

After a disagreement with traditional rival Vanderbilt University over gate receipts resulting in the 1899 game being canceled, manager Luke Lea sought a way to make up for the lost revenue. To accomplish this he put together an ambitious schedule of five big name opponents in six days.  Playing so many games in a short period minimized costs while maximizing revenue. 

The team also had a pair of African-American trainers or "rub down men", one whose name was Cal Burrows. They would rub the players after games and on the trains to lessen their pain and help the players to sleep.

Schedule

Source:

Season summary

Georgia

 Sources:

Fullback Ormond Simkins was the star of the 12–0 opening win over the Georgia Bulldogs, netting the first touchdown with a fine line buck of 12 yards through center "amidst thunderous applause". Halfback Rex Kilpatrick scored a second touchdown on a 4-yard run.

The starting lineup was: Sims (left end), Jones (left tackle), Keyes (left guard), Poole (center), Claiborne (right guard), Bolling (right tackle), Pearce (right end), Wilson (quarterback), Kilpatrick (left halfback), Seibels (right halfback), and Simkins (fullback).

Georgia Tech

 Sources:

Sewanee followed the defeat of Georgia with a 32–0 victory over Georgia Tech on the following Monday. Sewanee won easily, the first score coming soon after the kickoff on a blocked kick recovered by halfback Quintard Gray. Gray scored the next touchdown on a 25-yard end run. Just fifteen minutes had passed when halfback and captain Ditty Seibels scored the third touchdown. The next three touchdowns were also scored by Seibels, including pretty runs of 35 and 40 yards. He had one long scoring run called back due to a penalty. The team played its substitutes in the second half.

The starting lineup was: Sims (left end), Jones (left tackle), Keyes (left guard), Poole (center), Claiborne (right guard), Bolling (right tackle), Pearce (right end), Wilson (quarterback), Gray (left halfback), Seibels (right halfback), and Simkins (fullback).

Tennessee

Sources:

In a driving rain at McGee Field, "where each 5-yard line was a miniature stream", Sewanee beat the Tennessee Volunteers 46–0. Ditty Seibels led the scoring with three touchdowns. "Touchdown followed touchdown, until Sewanee finally stopped scoring from sheer exhaustion" to quote The Sewanee Purple.

The starting lineup was: Sims (left end), Jones (left tackle), Keyes (left guard), Poole (center), Claiborne (right guard), K. Smith (right tackle), Pearce (right end), Wilson (quarterback), Kilpatrick (left halfback), Seibels (right halfback), and Simkins (fullback).

Southwestern Presbyterian

Sources:

Sewanee next defeated Southwestern Presbyterian (now Rhodes College) 54–0. The Sewanee Purple wrote: "Never before in the history of football at Sewanee have we piled up such a score against an opponent."  That would change several weeks later when they played Cumberland.

The starting lineup was: Sims (left end), Jones (left tackle), Keyes (left guard), Poole (center), Claiborne (right guard), Bolling (right tackle), Pearce (right end), Wilson (quarterback), Gray (left halfback), Seibels (right halfback), and Simkins (fullback).

The Road trip: 5 shutouts in 6 days
The 1899 Iron Men team's most notable accomplishment was a six-day period from November 9 to 14 which is arguably the greatest road trip in college football history.  With 18 players, Lea, Suter, and the trainers left Sewanee on November 6.  

During this road trip, Sewanee outscored its opponents for a combined 91–0, including Texas, Texas A&M, LSU, and Ole Miss. Sewanee obliterated each one, traveling by train for some 2,500 miles. This feat, barring fundamental changes in modern-day football, can never be equaled. Contemporary sources called the road trip the most remarkable ever made by an American college team.

Texas

Sources:

After leaving the Cowan train station, manager Lea discovered they had left all the cleats at the train station.  Without telling anyone, Lea cleverly arranged for them to be shipped on later trains to arrive in time for the Texas game. 

The train carrying the players pulled into Austin on the night of the 8th to face the undefeated Texas Longhorns the following afternoon. Sewanee won 12–0. They scored five minutes into the first quarter, and a minute before the end of the game, "and the intervening time was devoted to the liveliest battle ever witnessed here". Ditty Seibels played throughout the game, scoring both touchdowns, despite his head having split open just above his left eye in the first half and bleeding profusely. He had his wound patched by plaster and he stayed in the game.  By the end of the game his head was coated with blood.

The starting lineup was: Sims (left end), Jones (left tackle), Keyes (left guard), Poole (center), Claiborne (right guard), Bolling (right tackle), Pearce (right end), Wilson (quarterback), Kilpatrick (left halfback), Seibels (right halfback), and Simkins (fullback).

Texas A&M

Sources:

Not 20 hours had passed since the Texas game before the Tigers faced the Texas A&M Aggies. The Tigers won 10–0. Guard "Wild Bill" Claiborne was blind in one eye, and used his discolored eye for purposes of intimidation by lifting his eye patch, goggling his eye around and saying, "This happened in the last game," leaving his opponent to worry about that. Ormond Simkins first ran in a touchdown from the 1-yard-line near the end of the first half. He also saved a touchdown with a crushing tackle of the A&M running back.   Texas A&M's campus paper, the Battalion, reported :..."(the Sewanee Tigers) are unmistakably the champions of the South this year..."

The starting lineup was: Sims (left end), Jones (left tackle), Keyes (left guard), Poole (center), Claiborne (right guard), Bolling (right tackle), Pearce (right end), Wilson (quarterback), Kilpatrick (left halfback), Gray (right halfback), and Simkins (fullback).

Tulane

Sources:

After another 350-mile overnight train leg, the Tigers beat Tulane in New Orleans 23–0. Rex Kilpatrick scored first. Quintard Gray scored twice more. The lone score of the second half was another, 5-yard run by Kilpatrick. The game was called early due to darkness.

The starting lineup was: Sims (left end), Jones (left tackle), Keyes (left guard), Poole (center), Claiborne (right guard), Bolling (right tackle), Pearce (right end), Wilson (quarterback), Kilpatrick (left halfback), Seibels (right halfback), and Simkins (fullback).

The team went to see a play on Saturday night in New Orleans.  One of the characters was dressed in purple, which was Sewanee's color, and the team rose up and gave the Sewanee cheer that aroused the whole audience.

LSU

Sources:

On Sunday, before the trip to Baton Rouge,  toured a sugar plantation owned by John Dalton Shaffer One source reported center William H. Poole "drank heavily" on the one day off. Sewanee then defeated LSU 34–0.  

Ditty Seibels scored first. Sewanee's next run from scrimmage was another Seibels touchdown; this time a 65-yard run. Rex Kilpatrick had one score, and Sewanee managed three further touchdowns. One account reads: "In spite of their long, tiresome trip, the Sewanee men were lively as school boys out for a day off."  The Sewanee players enjoyed the grass field in Baton Rouge after playing on rocks for a gridiron on their home field.

The starting lineup was: Sims (left end), Jones (left tackle), Keyes (left guard), Poole (center), Claiborne (right guard), Bolling (right tackle), Pearce (right end), Wilson (quarterback), Kilpatrick (left halfback), Gray (right halfback), and Simkins (fullback).

Ole Miss

Sources:

The Tigers arrived in Memphis to play Ole Miss on their third pre-game overnight train ride in five days. At the beginning of the game, Ole Miss objected to some Sewanee players wearing their meagre leather helmets, but the referee overruled their objection.  Ole Miss kept the game close. Diddy Seibels scored the first touchdown with fifteen seconds left in the first half, and Kilpatrick scored the second with thirteen to go before the final whistle. The game was attended by "several hundred spectators".

The local Commercial Appeal praised the Tigers: "Yesterday's score against (Mississippi) marked the two hundred and fortieth point for which the Tennesseans have scored to nothing for their opponents, during the present season. The trip of the Sewanee eleven, along with record, will probably remain unequaled for generations."

The road trip is recalled memorably with the Biblical allusion "...and on the seventh day they rested." But the fact is, they didn't rest.  They had three more games to play, including two of the toughest teams in the South, Auburn and North Carolina.

Cumberland

Sources:

One account reads: "For five minutes after the beginning of the game Cumberland made some good gains, but the Sewanee defense suddenly grew strong, the ball was secured on downs, and Seibels crossed the line for touchdown seven minutes after play began." Bart Sims had a school record 11 extra points, and Ormond Simkins rested instead of playing.

The starting lineup was: Sims (left end), Jones (left tackle), Keyes (left guard), Poole (center), Claiborne (right guard), Bolling (right tackle), Pearce (right end), Wilson (quarterback), Kilpatrick (left halfback), Seibels (right halfback), and Brooks (fullback)

Auburn: The only points scored

Sources:

On Thanksgiving Day in Montgomery, Sewanee faced John Heisman's Auburn team winning the contest by a narrow margin of 11–10. There were 4,000 people at the game, and there were fist fights, and even guns drawn.

Auburn was the only team to score on Sewanee all year, running a fast offense, and played exceptionally well on defense.  Auburn would lock arms to form a wedge for the ball carrier, so Suter told his ends to go at their legs, cleats first.  Auburn also had leather handles sewn on their pants to give their blockers and runners an extra advantage, and Sewanee requested that the referees require them to be cut off, which the referees did.  

After being held on downs at the 10-yard line, Auburn again drove down the field and scored first when Bivins ran in a touchdown. Ed Huguley followed this up with another 50-yard touchdown run, but the referee disallowed it.

Sewanee responded when Rex Kilpatrick ran outside the tackle for a 10-yard touchdown. Auburn back Arthur Feagin, with Huguley's interference, scored to make it 10 to 5 in favor of Auburn. 

A controversial fumble recovery by Sewanee may have saved the game. Auburn quarterback Reynolds Tichenor said it was a gift; the referee awarded Sewanee the ball, but he insisted Auburn recovered it. A double pass play to Warbler Wilson got the ensuing Sewanee touchdown. Bart Sims made the extra point to edge Auburn. Neither team managed to score in the second half. The delay from the crowd gathering on the field ran the game into darkness.  The referee called the game for darkness with only 14 minutes gone in the second half.

Sportswriter Fuzzy Woodruff, a witness to the game, wrote:Under Heisman's tutelage, Auburn played with a marvelous speed and dash that couldn't be gainsaid and which fairly swept Sewanee off its feet. Only the remarkable punting of Simkins kept the game from being a debacle. I recall vividly one incident of the game, which demonstrates clearly just how surprising was Sewanee's victory.

The Purple was taking time out...A Sewanee player was down, his head being bathed...Suter, the Sewanee coach, and Heisman, the Auburn mentory, were walking up and down the field together. They approached this boy...Suter, evidently as mad as fire, asked the down and out player 'Are you fellows going to be run over like this all afternoon?'

'Coach,' said the boy, lifting his tired head from the ground, 'we just can't stand this stuff. We've never seen anything like it.'

Suter and Heisman turned away. 'Can you beat that?' Suter asked the Auburn coach. Heisman didn't say anything, I guess he thought a great deal. He told me afterwards that he had never felt so sorry for a man on a football field as he had for Suter at that moment.

The starting lineup was: Pierce (left end), Jones (left tackle), Claiborne (left guard), Poole (center), Keyes (right guard), Bolling (right tackle), Sims (right end), Wilson (quarterback), Kilpatrick (left halfback), Seibels (right halfback), and Simkins (fullback).

North Carolina

Sources:

The season closed with a 5 to 0 victory over the North Carolina Tar Heels and the championship of the south. Sewanee's defense was strong, including a goal line stand, and Seibels' punting gained 10 yards on each exchange of punts. A single free kick from placement by Kilpatrick proved the difference.

Simkins had signaled for a fair catch, but North Carolina's Frank M. Osborne collided with him. Sewanee was awarded fifteen yards and the free kick. The star for the Tar Heels that day was Herman Koehler.

The starting lineup was: Simkins (left end), Jones (left tackle), Keyes (left guard), Poole (center), Claiborne (right guard), Bolling (right tackle), Black (right end), Wilson (quarterback), Kilpatrick (left halfback), Seibels (right halfback), and Hull (fullback).

Postseason

Awards and honors
W. A. Lambeth of Virginia in the journal Outing and Coach Suter both posted All-Southern teams. Included on Suter's All-Southern were: Richard Bolling, Wild Bill Claiborne, Deacon Jones, Rex Kilpatrick, William H. Poole, Diddy Seibels, Ormond Simkins, and Warbler Wilson. Wilson was also selected All-Southern by Lambeth. Bart Sims made Lambeth's team and was a substitute for Suter.

Legacy
By the end of the season, eleven of Sewanee's victories were against SIAA conference rivals, setting the record for the most conference games won in a single season by any team before or since. On College Gameday, November 13, 1999, ESPN featured the University of the South with a four-minute segment on the 1899 football team, and CSX Railroad provided a short train ride in Cowan, which was a re-enactment of an early leg of the Sewanee to Texas train ride.

Several writers and sports personalities consider this Sewanee team one of the greatest football teams ever to play. Former Penn State coach Joe Paterno once said: "While there are some who would swear to the contrary, I did not see the 1899 Sewanee football team play in person. Winning five road games in six days, all by shutout scores, has to be one of the most staggering achievements in the history of the sport. If the Bowl Championship Series (BCS) had been in effect in 1899, there seems little doubt Sewanee would have played in the title game. And they wouldn’t have been done in by any computer ratings." Tony Barnhart in Southern Fried Football: The History, Passion and Glory of the Great Southern Game listed Sewanee as his number 1 Southern football team of all-time. A 16-team playoff to determine the best team in college football history with winners decided by fan votes was run by the College Football Hall of Fame, called the March of the Gridiron Champions. Sewanee, starting at the lowest seed, won the tournament.

In 2022, a documentary film about the team was released.  Called  Unrivaled  the film chronicles the team and its season.

Personnel

Varsity lettermen

Line

Backfield

Substitutes

Coaching staff
 Head coach: Billy Suter
 Manager: Luke Lea
 Trainer: Cal Burrows

Scoring leaders
The following is an incomplete list of statistics and scores, largely dependent on newspaper summaries.

See also
 1899 College Football All-Southern Team
 List of undefeated NCAA Division I football teams

Notes

References

Books

External links
Documentary film, Unrivaled, www.sewanee1899.org

Sewanee
Sewanee Tigers football seasons
College football undefeated seasons
Sewanee Tigers football